As of March 2013, there were 83 public universities .In 2004, the public university system underwent partial privatization. University names which shifted are (ko).

The following is a complete list of Japanese public universities: 

 Aichi Prefectural University
 Aichi Prefectural University of Fine Arts and Music
 Advanced Institute of Industrial Technology
 Akita International University
 Akita Prefectural University
 Akita University of Art 
 Aomori Public University
 Aomori University of Health and Welfare
 Chiba Prefectural University of Health Sciences
 Ehime Prefectural University of Health Science
 Fukui Prefectural University
 Fukuoka Prefectural University
 Fukuoka Women's University
 Fukushima Medical University
 Fukuyama City University
 Future University Hakodate
 Gifu College of Nursing
 Gifu Pharmaceutical University
 Gunma Prefectural College of Health Sciences
 Gunma Prefectural Women's University
 Hiroshima City University
 Ibaraki Prefectural University of Health Sciences
 Institute of Advanced Media Arts and Sciences
 Ishikawa Prefectural University
 Iwate Prefectural University
 Kagawa Prefectural College of Health Sciences
 Kanagawa University of Human Services
 Kanazawa College of Art
 Kobe City College of Nursing
 Kobe City University of Foreign Studies
 Kochi University of Technology
 Kochi Women's University
 Kushiro Public University of Economics
 Kyoto City University of Arts
 Kyoto Prefectural University
 Kyoto Prefectural University of Medicine
 Kyushu Dental University 
 Maebashi Institute of Technology
 Meio University
 Mie Prefectural College of Nursing
 Miyagi University
 Miyazaki Municipal University
 Miyazaki Prefectural Nursing University
 Nagano College of Nursing
 Nagoya City University
 Nara Medical University
 Nara Prefectural University
 Nayoro City University
 Niigata College of Nursing
 Niimi College
 Oita University of Nursing and Health Sciences
 Okayama Prefectural University
 Okinawa Prefectural College of Nursing
 Okinawa Prefectural University of Arts
 Onomichi City University
 Osaka Metropolitan University
 Prefectural University of Hiroshima
 Prefectural University of Kumamoto
 Saitama Prefectural University
 Sanyo-Onoda City University
 Sapporo City University
 Sapporo Medical University
 Shimonoseki City University
 Shizuoka University of Art and Culture
 Shunan University
 Takasaki City University of Economics
 The University of Nagano
 The University of Shiga Prefecture
 Tokyo Metropolitan University
 Tottori University of Environmental Studies
 Toyama Prefectural University
 Tsuru University
 University of Aizu
 University of Fukuchiyama
 University of Hyogo
 University of Kitakyushu
 University of Nagasaki
 University of Niigata Prefecture
 University of Shimane
 University of Shizuoka
 Wakayama Medical University
 Yamagata Prefectural University of Health Sciences
 Yamaguchi Prefectural University
 Yamanashi Prefectural University
 Yokohama City University

See also
Public university
Education in Japan
List of universities in Japan

References 

 
Public